Hans-Joachim Menge (born 27 February 1963) is a German luger. He competed in the men's doubles event at the 1984 Winter Olympics.

References

External links
 

1963 births
Living people
German male lugers
Olympic lugers of East Germany
Lugers at the 1984 Winter Olympics
People from Eichsfeld (district)
Sportspeople from Thuringia